Very Severe Cyclonic Storm Nivar was a tropical cyclone which brought severe impacts to portions of Tamil Nadu and Andhra Pradesh in late November 2020. The eighth depression and fourth named storm of the 2020 North Indian Ocean cyclone season, Nivar originated from a disturbance in the Intertropical Convergence Zone. The disturbance gradually organized and on November 23, both the Joint Typhoon Warning Center (JTWC) and the India Meteorological Department (IMD) reported that a tropical depression has formed. On the next day, both agencies upgraded the system to a tropical storm, with the latter assigning it the name Nivar. Nivar made its landfall over north coastal Tamil Nadu between Puducherry and Chennai close to Marakkanam. Overall, Nivar caused $600 million in damages.

Meteorological history 

On November 22, an area of low pressure was formed in the Bay of Bengal, off the coast of Tamil Nadu. It intensified into a depression on the early hours of November 23. In the early hours of November 24, it intensified into a cyclonic storm and it was named Nivar. Immediately, the Joint Typhoon Warning Centre gave a TCFA and designated unofficially as Tropical Cyclone 04B. IMD issued cyclone warnings off the coast of Tamil Nadu, Pondicherry and Sri Lanka. On 25th, the cyclone reached its peak intensity of 120 kmph which makes it as a Very Severe Cyclonic Storm. The JTWC designated it as a category 1 tropical cyclone of 130 kmph. It made a landfall in Marakkanam close to Pondicherry on the midnight of November 25. Then it gradually weakened into a Deep Depression on early hours of 26th and JTWC issued the final warning at the same time . Afterwards the system entered back into the Bay of Bengal as a Deep Depression and made second and final landfall at Andhra Pradesh coast on the same day. It weakened on the early hours of November 27 at Rayalaseema region.

Preparations

Sri Lanka
Red warnings were put in place for northern Sri Lanka, with the threat of heavy rainfall in the region.

India
On 24 November, six National Disaster Response Force (NDRF) teams have been posted to Cuddalore and two teams will be deployed in Chennai. Tamil Nadu government suspended bus services until further orders in seven districts of Thiruvarur, Nagapattinam, Pudukkottai, Thanjavur, Viluppuram, Chengalpattu and Cuddalore. During a review meeting, Former Chief Minister of Tamil Nadu, K. Palaniswami asked his cabinet members and officials to remain completely vigilant and take necessary precautions ahead of the Cyclone. Officials were also directed to ensure that people in vulnerable areas were evacuated. Measures were taken by the Tamil Nadu government to store dry rations and fuel for the people after the cyclone's impact. The Tamil Nadu government declared a statewide holiday on 25 November. The Tamil Nadu state government reported that more than 100,000 people were evacuated and were sheltered in 1000 relief centers.

The District magistrate of the Nellore district of Andhra Pradesh reported that 3,363 people were sheltered in 115 relief camps.

On November 26, the IMD issued yellow alert in several parts of Karnataka including Bengaluru.

Impact

Sri Lanka
Showers and thunderstorms associated with Nivar impacted parts of Sri Lanka as the system moved inland on November 26.

India

Tamil Nadu 
The cyclone brought heavy to very heavy rains over north coastal Tamil Nadu starting 23 November 2020. Chennai received continuous downpours on 23,24,25 November 2020 with IMD Chennai recording 163mm ending 25 November 8:30 AM IST. Chennai and other parts of North TN saw gusty winds touching 60-70kmph on 24,25 November. Several roads were closed in the area of the Greater Chennai Corporation were closed due to waterlogging. Due to intense rainfall, Chembarambakkam Lake released water for the first time after five years. Many areas including Madipakkam, Velachery, Adambakkam and suburbs around Tambaram and low-lying regions along the river Adyar were flooded. Rainwater entering houses was also seen in some places in the western suburbs. The Greater Chennai Corporation removed uprooted trees from 223 roads. The estimates of Chennai civic officials reported that flood water entered around 40,000 homes within the borders of the corporation. Five people were reported dead in Tamil Nadu.

Puducherry 
Trees were uprooted, electric poles were damaged and several areas were flooded as of November 26. The Chief Minister of Puducherry V. Narayanasamy reported that the initial loss in agriculture and other sectors was estimated at ₹4 billion (US$54.2 million).

Andhra Pradesh 
Eight people were  reported dead in Andhra Pradesh. The rainfalls made significant impact on the districts of Chittoor, Prakasam, Kadapa and Nellore, 112000 people were affected, 2,294 houses/huts were damaged, 6,133 homes were left stranded, 2,618 small animals, 88 large animals and 8,130 poultry birds were reported dead based on a preliminary evaluation. In Nellore district, Paddy seedlings in 2500 hectares drowned and in Prakasam district, standing crops in 34,000 hectares were damaged. Loss of APSPDCL was amounted to be ₹50.7 million (US$687,000).

See also 

Tropical cyclones in 2020
2020 North Indian Ocean cyclone season
Cyclone Gaja – Another destructive cyclone which hit the similar areas.
Cyclone Vardah
Cyclone Thane
Cyclone Amphan
Cyclone Burevi

References

External links

Nivar
November 2020 events in Asia
2020 in India
2020 North Indian Ocean cyclone season
Nivar